Ismael Futebol Clube is an Angolan sports club from the northern city of Uíge.

In 2015, the team won the Uige province football championship and won the right to contest at the Gira Angola, the Angolan second division championship, for a spot at the Girabola.

Achievements
Angolan League: 0

Angolan Cup: 0

Angolan SuperCup: 0

Gira Angola: 0

Uíge provincial championship: 1 
 2015

League & Cup Positions

Players

Manager history

See also
Girabola

References

External links
 
 

Football clubs in Angola
Sports clubs in Angola
Association football clubs established in 2014
2014 establishments in Angola